The knockout stages of the 2014 Copa Libertadores de América were played from April 16 to August 13, 2014. A total of 16 teams competed in the knockout stages.

Qualified teams
The winners and runners-up of each of the eight groups in the second stage qualified for the knockout stages.

Seeding
The qualified teams were seeded in the knockout stages according to their results in the second stage, with the group winners seeded 1–8, and the group runners-up seeded 9–16.

Format
In the knockout stages, the 16 teams played a single-elimination tournament, with the following rules:
Each tie was played on a home-and-away two-legged basis, with the higher-seeded team hosting the second leg. However, CONMEBOL required that the second leg of the finals must be played in South America, i.e., a finalist from Mexico must host the first leg regardless of seeding.
In the round of 16, quarterfinals, and semifinals, if tied on aggregate, the away goals rule was used. If still tied, the penalty shoot-out was used to determine the winner (no extra time was played).
In the finals, if tied on aggregate, the away goals rule was not used, and 30 minutes of extra time was played. If still tied after extra time, the penalty shoot-out was used to determine the winner.
If there were two semifinalists from the same association, they must play each other.

Bracket
The bracket of the knockout stages was determined by the seeding as follows:
Round of 16:
Match A: Seed 1 vs. Seed 16
Match B: Seed 2 vs. Seed 15
Match C: Seed 3 vs. Seed 14
Match D: Seed 4 vs. Seed 13
Match E: Seed 5 vs. Seed 12
Match F: Seed 6 vs. Seed 11
Match G: Seed 7 vs. Seed 10
Match H: Seed 8 vs. Seed 9
Quarterfinals:
Match S1: Winner A vs. Winner H
Match S2: Winner B vs. Winner G
Match S3: Winner C vs. Winner F
Match S4: Winner D vs. Winner E
Semifinals: (if there were two semifinalists from the same association, they must play each other)
Match F1: Winner S1 vs. Winner S4
Match F2: Winner S2 vs. Winner S3
Finals: Winner F1 vs. Winner F2

Round of 16
The first legs were played on April 16–17 and 23–24, and the second legs were played on April 22–23, 29–30, and May 1, 2014.

|}

Match A

Nacional won 3–2 on aggregate.

Match B

Tied 1–1 on aggregate, San Lorenzo won on penalties.

Match C

Lanús won 4–1 on aggregate.

Match D

Atlético Nacional won 2–1 on aggregate.

Match E

Tied 2–2 on aggregate, Defensor Sporting won on penalties.

Match F

Tied 3–3 on aggregate, Bolívar won on away goals.

Match G

Cruzeiro won 3–1 on aggregate.

Match H

Arsenal won 1–0 on aggregate.

Quarterfinals
The first legs were played on May 7–8, and the second legs were played on May 14–15, 2014.

|}

Match S1

Nacional won 1–0 on aggregate.

Match S2

San Lorenzo won 2–1 on aggregate.

Match S3

Bolívar won 2–1 on aggregate.

Match S4

Defensor Sporting won 3–0 on aggregate.

Semifinals
The first legs were played on July 22–23, and the second legs were played on July 29–30, 2014.

|}

Match F1

Nacional won 2–1 on aggregate.

Match F2

San Lorenzo won 5–1 on aggregate.

Finals

The finals were played on a home-and-away two-legged basis, with the higher-seeded team hosting the second leg. If tied on aggregate, the away goals rule was not used, and 30 minutes of extra time was played. If still tied after extra time, the penalty shoot-out was used to determine the winner.

The first leg was played on August 6, and the second leg was played on August 13, 2014.

San Lorenzo won 2–1 on aggregate.

References

External links
 
Copa Libertadores 2014, CONMEBOL.com 

3